Chancellor of the Russian Empire was a civil position (class) in the Russian Empire, according to the Table of Ranks introduced by Peter the Great in 1722. Chancellor was a civil rank of the 1st class and equal to those of Active Privy Councillor, 1st class, General Field Marshal in the Army, and General Admiral in the Navy. The rank holder should be addressed as Your High Excellency (Vashe Vysokoprevoskhoditelstvo).

Overview
Chancellors held the most senior positions in the Russian Empire. Usually, this title was assigned to the Foreign Ministers. If the Minister had the rank of the 2nd class, he could be called Vice-Chancellor. In the entire history of the Russian Empire, there were only 12 Chancellors, fewer than reigning monarchs. As a general rule, except for the period of the Napoleonic Wars, there could be only one Chancellor at any given time. It might take as long as 10 years to appoint a new Chancellor when the previous one died. Therefore, other officers of the 1st class were Active privy councillors, 1st class.

After the appointment of Alexander Gorchakov, no more Chancellors were appointed for the last 50 years of the Russian Empire, even though the rank was not officially canceled. For the last 35 years, since the death of Gorchakov, the Russian Empire still appointed no Chancellors. The rank was abolished in 1917 by the Soviet decree on estates and civil ranks.

Chancellors of the Russian Empire
1667 – 1671 Count Afanasy Ordin-Nashchokin (1605-1680).
1671 – 1676 Count Artamon Matveyev (1625-1682).
1676 – 1680 Count Larion Ivanov (?-1682).
1680 – 1681 Count Vasily Volynsky (?-1682).
1681 – 1682 Count Larion Ivanov (?-1682).
1682 – 1689 Prince Vasily Vasilyevich Golitsyn (1643-1714).
1689 – 1699 Count Yemelyan Ukraintsev (1641-1708).
1697 – 1699 Count  (1664-1705).
1699 – 1706 Count Fyodor Alexeyevich Golovin (1650-1706).
1706 – 1734 Count Gavriil Ivanovich Golovkin (1660-1734).
1740 – 1742 Prince Alexey Cherkassky (1680-1742).
1744 – 1758 Count Alexey Bestuzhev-Ryumin (1693-1766), in 1758 deprived of the rank of Chancellor, in 1762 received the rank of Field Marshal.
1758 – 1765 Count Mikhail Illarionovich Vorontsov (1714-1767).
1796 – 1797 Count Ivan Andreyevich Osterman (1725-1811).
1797 – 1799 Prince Alexander Bezborodko (1747-1799).
1802 – 1805 Count Alexander Vorontsov (1741-1805).
1809 – 1826 Count Nikolay Rumyantsev (1754-1826).
1834 – Prince Viktor Kochubey (1768-1834).
1844 – 1862 Count Karl Nesselrode (1780-1862).
1867 – 1883 Prince Alexander Gorchakov (1798-1883).

See also
Chancellor of Austria
Chancellor of Germany
Chancellor of Norway
Chancellor of Poland
List of chancellors of Germany
Lord Chancellor

References

Titles in Russia
 
Civil ranks of the Russian Empire